Old Jamestown is a census-designated place (CDP) in St. Louis County, Missouri, United States. The population was 19,184 at the 2010 census. Old Jamestown is northwest of the city of St. Louis and borders the Missouri River.

Geography
The community is located mostly to the north and west of U.S. Route 67 in northern St. Louis County. West Alton is to the north, across the Missouri River. Florissant is to the southwest, and Black Jack and Spanish Lake are to the south.

Demographics

References

External links 
Old Jamestown Association website

Census-designated places in St. Louis County, Missouri
Census-designated places in Missouri